Harmony is the second studio album by Catholic group, The Priests.  It was released in 2009 on RCA Records.

Track listing
 "How Great Thou Art"
 "Te Deum"
 "Gaelic Blessing"
 "Amazing Grace"
 "Bist du bei mir (When Thou Art Near)"
 "Benedictus"
 "Stabat Mater"
 "Laudamus Te"
 "Ave Verum Corpus"
 "King Of Kings"
 "Lift Thine Eyes (From Elijah)"
 "Silent Night"
 "The Lord's Prayer"
 "Bí Íosa Im Chroíse"
 "You'll Never Walk Alone"

Charts

Weekly charts

Year-end charts

References

External links
 The Priests Official Website

2009 albums
Epic Records albums
The Priests albums